Bambey Department is one of the 45 departments of Senegal, one of the three making up the Diourbel Region.

Its capital and the only commune in the department is Bambey.

The rural districts (communautés rurales) are:

Baba Garage Arrondissement:
 
 
 
Lambaye Arrondissement:
 
 
 
 
Ngoye Arrondissement:
 
 
 
 

Historic sites 
 Tumulus of Lambaye (sites of the teignes (moths?))
 Tène-Mbambey, battlefield at Mbambey Sérère
 Gouye Ndeung, baobab tree on the site of the Battle of Sanghay at Lambaye
 Battlefield at Sanghay-Mbol
 Site of battle of Ndiarème, near Sindiane
 Mausoleum of Cheikh Anta Diop at Thieytou, Dinguiraye
 Tumulus of Pouniar, Lambaye Arrondissement 
 Tumulus of Gallo Peye, Ndangalma 
 Tumulus of Peul Lamassas, Ndangalma

References

Departments of Senegal
Diourbel Region